Sal Salandra (born January 1, 1946) is an American contemporary artist who creates primarily homoerotic embroidery which he calls "thread painting."

Biography 
Sal Salandra is a second-generation Italian-American who grew up in Edgewood, New Jersey with three brothers and three sisters as a devout Catholic who considered a career in the priesthood. Christian imagery remains present in his artwork. Salandra studied to become a priest; however, because of his severe dyslexia, he gave up this career path and instead became a hairdresser. Salandra worked as a hairdresser in New Jersey for 55 years. In 1993, Salandra moved with his husband to East Hampton, New York from the couple's apartment in the West Village.

Salandra picked up needlepoint in 1980 when he was bedridden with the flu, with a needlepoint kit he received as a gift from his mother-in-law. In 2015 he began using needlepoint to make figurative images of human forms. This change lead to his trademark homoerotic motifs. His work melds leather, BDSM, and other gay sexual subcultures with figures from American pop culture and Catholic iconography. Salandra cites the corporeal punishments intrinsic to Catholic tradition as an inspiration for his BDSM scenes.

His "thread paintings" are often composed of multiple smaller scenes composing one larger scene. As Osman Can Yerebakan analyzes Salandra's work for the Brooklyn Rail: "he blends Hieronymus Bosch’s chaos with the flat pseudo-perspectives of Middle Eastern and South Asian miniature painting."

Salandra received media attention after his inclusion in the January 2020 iteration of New York's Outsider Art Fair brought a new focus on his work. The completely self-taught artist had his first 2021 solo show with appointment-only gallery Club Rhubarb, when he was 75-years old and that was followed by a group show in the Netherlands in 2022. His works are often displayed in "candy-colored" frames.

References 

1946 births
American embroiderers
Living people
Artists from New Jersey
20th-century American male artists
21st-century American male artists
Catholics from New Jersey
People with dyslexia
Queer artists
American hairdressers
Artists with disabilities
American people of Italian descent
American gay artists
BDSM
Gay male BDSM